The 2015 Boys' EuroHockey Youth Championships was the 9th edition of the Boys' EuroHockey Youth Championships. It was held from 24 to 30 July 2016 in Cork, Ireland at the Mardyke Arena.

Germany were the defending champions. The Czech Republic and Italy have been promoted from the Youth Championship II.

Qualified teams

Format
The eight teams will be split into two groups of four teams. The top two teams advance to the semifinals to determine the winner in a knockout system. The bottom two teams play in a new group with the teams they did not play against in the group stage. The last two teams will be relegated to the Youth Championship II.

Results
''All times are local (UTC+2).

Preliminary round

Pool A

Pool B

Classification round

Fifth to eighth place classification

Pool C

First to fourth place classification

Semi-finals

Third and fourth place

Final

Statistics

Final standings

Goalscorers

References

External links
European Hockey Federation
Official website

Youth Championships
EuroHockey Youth Championships
EuroHockey Youth Championships
International field hockey competitions hosted by Ireland
EuroHockey Youth Championships Boys
EuroHockey Youth Championship